Prowse may refer to
Prowse (surname)
Prowse Point Commonwealth War Graves Commission Cemetery in Belgium
Keith Prowse, a British trading company
1978 Keith Prowse International, a women's tennis tournament

See also
 Rowse